Michael Kavanaugh White  (born January 4, 1936) is former American football player and coach. He has 16 years experience as a head coach, including stints at the University of California, Berkeley (1972–1977), the University of Illinois (1980–1987) and the Oakland Raiders of the National Football League (NFL) (1995–1996).

College coaching career
During his college coaching career, White was twice named National Coach of the Year, first in 1975 at California.  He coached a team led by Joe Roth, Chuck Muncie and Wesley Walker to the Pac-8 co-championship—the school's first conference title in 18 years.

White moved to the University of Illinois in 1980.  He succeeded Gary Moeller, who in three seasons at Illinois finished no higher than eighth in the Big Ten Conference.  White quickly turned around the Illinois football program, posting a winning season in only his second year.  In 1982, he led the Illini to the Liberty Bowl, the school's first bowl appearance since the 1964 Rose Bowl.  The 1982 Liberty Bowl was also notable as the final game coached by University of Alabama head coach Bear Bryant.  In 1983, Illinois won its first Big Ten title in 20 years with an overall record of 10–1, including a 9–0 conference record, and played in the 1984 Rose Bowl.  It also marked the first time since 1967 that neither Michigan nor Ohio State won at least a share of the conference title.  White was honored for his team's achievements by being named UPI Coach of the Year.  The 1983 Illinois team is the only team in Big Ten history to beat each of the other conference teams in a single season, an achievement made possible by the fact that rarely in conference history have teams played all the other teams in a season.  White also led the Fighting Illini to the 1985 Peach Bowl, which they lost to Army 31–29. In eight seasons at Illinois, White's teams had a combined record of 47–41–3, for a winning percentage of .533. Along the way, White coached future NFL quarterbacks Dave Wilson, Tony Eason, and Jack Trudeau, and record-setting wide receiver David Williams. White resigned as Illinois coach after the 1987 season due to recruiting violations.

NFL coaching career
White's years as the head coach of the Oakland Raiders are best recalled for the team's collapse in the 1995 season, the team's first in Oakland after a 12-year sojourn in Los Angeles, when the 8–2 Raiders went into a nosedive, losing their final six games to finish 8–8 and not make the playoffs. Following a 7–9 record in 1996, White was fired by the Raiders on Christmas Eve, being given the news by Bruce Allen though Al Davis was involved in the decision.  It is likely that the call was made in the morning, allowing White's family to enjoy Christmas Eve. White was on the coaching staff of the Rams from 1997-1999, including a Super Bowl victory at the conclusion of the '99 season. White later served as the Director of Football Administration for the Kansas City Chiefs.

Personal and later life
White is a member of Delta Upsilon fraternity.

White is a board member for the Lott IMPACT Trophy, which is named after Ronnie Lott and is awarded annually to college football's Defensive IMPACT Player of the Year.

Head coaching record

College

National Football League

References

1936 births
Living people
American football ends
American football halfbacks
California Golden Bears football coaches
California Golden Bears football players
Illinois Fighting Illini football coaches
Stanford Cardinal football coaches
Los Angeles Raiders coaches
Kansas City Chiefs executives
San Francisco 49ers coaches
St. Louis Rams coaches
Oakland Raiders head coaches
Players of American football from Berkeley, California
Sportspeople from Berkeley, California